Laura Pedersen is an American author and playwright. She worked at American Stock Exchange before writing her first book, Play Money.

Early life and education
Pedersen is the only child of John and Ellen Pedersen. She grew up in Amherst, New York, and secured a 4-year BS degree in Finance at New York University's Stern School of Business in New York City in 1987. She worked as a clerk at the American Stock Exchange when she was 18, and had a seat on the exchange at age 20, at that time the youngest person to do so. She received an honorary doctorate degree from Canisius College in 2013.

Career 

In 1991 Pedersen and F. Peter Model wrote a book, Play Money, about her time at the American Stock Exchange. She was a columnist for The New York Times from 1995 to 2002. In 2001–2002 she hosted a finance show, Your Money & Your Life, on the Oxygen channel. She has authored numerous books in both fiction and non-fiction categories. Pedersen is currently the President of The Authors Guild Foundation.

Works

Non-fiction books 

 Play Money (1991)
 Buffalo Gal: A Memoir (2008) 
 Buffalo Unbound: A Celebration (2010) 
 Planes, Trains, And Auto-Rickshaws: A Journey Through Modern India (2012) 
 Life In New York: How I Learned To Love Squeegee Men, Token Suckers, Trash Twister, and Subway Sharks (2015) 
 A Theory of Everything Else: Essays (2020) 
 It's Come to This: A Pandemic Diary (2021)

Fiction books 

 Going Away Party (2001)    
 Beginner's Luck (Book One in The Hallie Palmer Series) (2003)
 Last Call (2003) 
 Heart's Desire (Book Two in The Hallie Palmer Series) (2005) 
 The Big Shuffle (Book Three in The Hallie Palmer Series) (2006) 
 Best Bet (Book Four in The Hallie Palmer Series) (2009) 
 Fool's Mate (2011)

Short story 

 The Sweetest Hours (2006)

Children's books 

 Unplugged: Ella Gets Her Family Back (2012) 
 Ava's Adventure (2014) 
 Wanda's Better Way (2017) 
 Dana Digs In (2020)

Dramas 

 For Heaven's Sake! 
 A Dozen Perfect Moments
 Living Arrangements
 This Will All Be Yours
 The Brightness of Heaven
 Community Service

References 

 Kirkus review
 WBFO

Living people
21st-century American novelists
American women novelists
Novelists from New York (state)
21st-century American women writers
American women non-fiction writers
21st-century American non-fiction writers
Year of birth missing (living people)